Tunka may refer to:

People
 Tunka Manin (1010–1078), ruler of the Ghana Empire
 Ondřej Tunka (born 1990), Czech canoeist

Places
 Tunka, Republic of Buryatia, Russia, a village
 Tunka Range, a mountain in Buryatia, Russia
 , a tributary of the Irkut River of Buryatia, Russia

Other uses
 Tunka experiment, in physics

See also
 Tunka Suka, a mountain in Peru
 Tunka Tunka, a 2021 Punjabi-language drama film
 Tunca (disambiguation)